Greenwood, Texas is a small town in Wise County, Texas, Texas, USA. The Entravision Texas Tower is nearby, which is one of the tallest towers on earth.

Geography of Wise County, Texas